Arpheuilles may refer to the following places in France:

Arpheuilles, Cher, a commune in the department of Cher
Arpheuilles, Indre, a commune in the department of Indre
Arpheuilles-Saint-Priest, a commune in the department of Allier